Mahmud Dantata (1922–1983) was a Nigerian businessman and politician who represented Kano East  under the platform of NPC in the Nigerian House of Representatives from 1965 to 1966. Dantata was originally sympathetic to the cause of the opposition party NEPU, led by Aminu Kano but after an incarceration, he aligned with the dominant party to defeat Aminu Kano for a seat in the House of Representatives in 1964.

Life
Dantata was born in the Sarari quarters of Kano in 1922. He was one of the most famous son of Alhassan Dantata, popularly known as Mamuda Wapa, a wealthy merchant, Dantata completed his formal education in Ghana. Thereafter, he joined his father's business in 1945. In 1948, he branched out on his own, setting up investments in tourism, hotel, currency trading, sugar mill and petrol stations. His hotel was built in Wapa of Fagge quarters of Kano. By 1950, he started exploring ways to transport pilgrims by road through Sudan to Saudi Arabia. He founded a pilgrimage Company which was known as West African Pilgrimage Agency(WAPA), and acquired buses for the transportation of pilgrims. A year later, he started a chartered flight service to transport pilgrims by air from Kano. In the Fagge quarters of Kano, he reclaimed a swampy land to build WAPA house, the area later became known for currency trading. Dantata himself soon dedicated a section of his business to currency trading.

In 1957, he was charged with illegal printing of currency notes and was imprisoned. After his release, he switched political allegiance to NPC and won a parliamentary election to represent Kano East.WAPA house diversified into lodging and cinema and the businesses where managed by Sabo Bakin Zuwo who later became Kano state's Governor in 1983.

References

1922 births
1983 deaths
20th-century Nigerian businesspeople
Dantata family
Businesspeople from Kano
People from Kano State